Chernogorovo is a large village in Pazardzhik Municipality, Pazardzhik Province, southern Bulgaria.  the population is 2,338. The village is located on the left bank of the Luda Yana river in a rich agricultural region. There are two petrol stations.

References 

Villages in Pazardzhik Province